Blackcrowned is the first compilation album by Swedish black metal band Marduk. It is composed of previously unreleased material recorded and mixed at Bloodspawn Studios and The Abyss between September 1992 and September 2001, and was released on February 19, 2002 by Regain Records.

Track listing

Personnel
 Andreas Axelsson – vocals
 Legion – vocals
 Morgan Steinmeyer Håkansson – guitar
 Magnus "Devo" Andersson – guitar
 B. War – bass
 Joakim Göthberg – drums, vocals
 Fredrik Andersson – drums
 Dan Swanö – mixing
 Peter Tägtgren – mixing

2002 compilation albums
Marduk (band) compilation albums